St Catherine's Point is the southernmost point on the Isle of Wight. It is close to the village of Niton and the point where the Back of the Wight changes to the Undercliff of Ventnor.

On nearby St Catherine's Down is St Catherine's Oratory, locally known as the "Pepperpot", a stone lighthouse built in the 1323 by Walter De Godeton. It is Britain's oldest medieval lighthouse.

Reportedly, de Godeton felt guilty for having scavenged wine, destined for a monastery from the wreck of the St Marie of Bayonne in Chale Bay. He was ordered, on pain of excommunication, to make amends by building this lighthouse. Fires were lit in the lighthouse tower to warn ships at sea of the presence of the coast.

There was an attached chapel at one time, but it has been long demolished. There is a Bronze Age barrow nearby which was excavated in the 1920s.

A replacement lighthouse was begun in 1785. However it was never completed. Locally this half-finished building is known as the "salt pot".

St Catherine's point is often foggy, so it is not the best location for a lighthouse, but as a weather station the location is fairly suitable. The weather station is one of the 22 locations whose reports are included in the BBC Shipping Forecast.

LB&SCR H1 class 4-4-2 no. 40 (later no. B40 and 2040) was named St. Catherine's Point after this landmark.

Climate

See also
Egypt Point

References

External links
Weather station information at Met Office



Headlands of the Isle of Wight
Nature Conservation Review sites